The Knowsley Hall shootings took place on the evening of 9 October 1952 in Knowsley Hall, Merseyside, England.  Harold Winstanley, a 19-year-old trainee footman at the house, shot his employer, Lady Derby, and three colleagues.  Two of those shot died, the butler William Stallard and the under-butler Douglas Stuart.  Winstanley fled the scene, assaulting the chef whilst doing so, and went to a local pub.  He later caught a bus into Liverpool where he handed himself into the police.  Winstanley was tried for the two murders and found guilty but insane and committed to Broadmoor Hospital.

Background 

Knowsley Hall is the ancestral home of the Earls of Derby, located in Merseyside, England.  In 1952 it was the residence of John Stanley, 18th Earl of Derby and his wife Lady Derby  Isabel Milles-Lade, daughter of the Hon. Henry Milles-Lade).  The couple had married in 1948 and were childless.  In contrast with some other aristocratic families, who had down-sized their staffs significantly to save costs, the Derbys continued to maintain a large staff at Knowsley, though much of the house was unused and shut-off.

Among the staff was Harold Winstanley, a 19-year-old trainee footman.  Winstanley had been born in nearby Aintree.  His father had died when he was three years old and some of his siblings and half-siblings had been taken into care.  Winstanley remained with his mother and studied at the Walton Technical College, where he performed well academically.  Winstnaley's mother was admitted to a mental institution in August 1946 and remained there until after the events of 1952.

Winstanley had briefly served with the Scots Guards but was invalided on account of tuberculosis.  After his discharge he spent a period with the Royal Liverpool Golf Club in the Wirral before joining the staff at Knowsley Hall on 15 December 1951.  Winstanley was trained in his role by the house's 40-year-old butler William Stallard and 29-year-old under-butler Douglas Stuart and was well-regarded by his colleagues.

On 7 October 1952 Winstanley met a friend at Hoylake and became aware that he owned a "Schmeisser" MP-40 sub-machine gun. Winstanley expressed an interest in the weapon and agreed to purchase it, together with 400 rounds of ammunition, for £3 and a pair of trousers.  Winstanley took possession of the weapon at 5 pm on 8 October and smuggled it into Knowsley Hall down his trousers.  That evening he filled the gun's magazines, finding he possessed only 200 rounds.  He test fired the gun in the grounds, showing it to a servant named Cooke.  On the 9 October he cleaned and oiled the weapon and showed it to Anne Mitchell, a housemaid, telling her to keep it secret as he could be arrested for not having a gun license.  Later in the day he asked Lord Derby's secretary when he was expected home, but he did not know.

Shootings 

At around 8.15 pm Lady Derby was dining alone in the first floor Smoke Room.  She was eating a dinner brought to her by the staff, whilst sat at a table facing the corner of the room, watching a television set to her left.  The door from the First Library was to her right and the door to the Second Library, which was kept locked, was to her left.

Winstanley entered the room from the First Library, smoking a cigarette, which was not permitted for the staff.   Lady Derby asked him what he wanted, stood up and turned to face him, when she noticed he was holding the MP-40. Winstanley told Lady Derby to turn around and when she did so he shot her.  Lady Derby was wounded slightly in the neck and fell forwards onto the floor, where she feigned death. She was struck by one round which had entered the back of her neck and exited near he left ear.  In a statement made to the police after his arrest Winstanley said he had intended to ask Lady Derby to help him dispose of the gun but had shot her after he became frightened.  He said he told her to turn around as he did not want to shoot her when she was looking at him.

As she was lying Lady Derby heard Stallard enter and address Winstanley before he was shot and killed.  Stallard was hit by five bullets, two of which caused fatal wounds to his head.  It was established at the trial that Stallard was responding to the staff call bell which had been activated from the Smoke Room and the prosecution stated that only Winstanley was in a position to do so.  The prosecution maintained that Winstanley had hidden in the First Library as Stallard passed through and shot him after he entered the Smoke Room.

After Stallard's killing Lady Derby also heard Stuart, who is thought to have heard the first shots and come to investigate, enter the Smoke Room and say "no".  He pled for his life, noting that he had a wife, to which  Winstanley told him "I will look after your wife" before shooting a burst of fire.  Stuart made for the locked door to the Second Library but was hit by a second burst of fire and killed.  He was struck by five bullet in the head, chest and abdomen and the police surgeon thought that all bar one would have been fatal alone.  The police determined that 17 shots had been fired in the Smoke Room, all form a position near the door to the First Library. They thought that seven had been directed at Lady Derby and five each at the butlers.

After killing the two men Winstanley moved to the first floor hall where he met William Sullivan, Lord Derby's valet.  Sullivan had heard the shots from the second floor and moved to investigate.  Sullivan asked Winstanley what he was doing but he did not answer, instead asking that Mitchell and another housemaid, watching from the floor above to come down.  When the housemaids refused Sullivan ran downstairs to the ground floor, pursued by Winstanley.  On reaching the ground floor Winstanley opened fire, wounding Sullivan in the hand with one of eleven shots.  Sullivan collapsed into the entrance to the lift shaft and Winstanley was aiming at him when other staff arrived on the scene.

The housekeeper, Mrs Turley, tried to calm Winstanley down.  He told her he had killed Stallard, Stuart and Lady Derby but would not hurt the female staff.  Turley made to call for the police but Winstanley threatened to shoot her if she did.  In the meantime Lady Derby's lady's maid, Miss Doxford, had found her and called the police from an upstairs telephone at 8.45 pm.  Winstanley went to his room on the ground floor to get his coat and the chef, Mr. Dupuy, tried to reason with him.  As they were walking down a corridor to the exit Dupuy tried to seize the gun.  Winstanley struck him over the head with it, causing nine rounds to discharge into the wall.  Dupuy was only lightly wounded on the head.  Winstanley then left the house.

Police search
The Liverpool City Police responded to the call and attended the house.  A police surgeon treated Lady Derby and took her to the Liverpool Royal Infirmary in his car.  A police search was begun.  Winstanley had gone to the Coppull House, a local public house, where he drank a pint of beer.  He then caught a bus to Liverpool city centre where, at 11.42 pm,  he called 999 from a public telephone box to hand himself in. He was arrested by Liverpool City Police officers as he was in the act of leaving the phone box and pulling the gun from under his coat.  On arrest Winstanley said  repeatedly "I don't know why I did it".  The MP-40 was recovered with a round in the breech and one full magazine and 131 loose rounds were recovered from his person.  Under police questioning Witsnley admitted to carrying out the shootings.

Trial 

Winstanley was charged with the murders of Stallard and Stuart.  He was brought before Prescot Magistrate's Court for a committal hearing at 10.34 am on 5 November.  The prosecution case was led by  F. D. Barry and the defence by solicitor Rex Makin.  Some 23 witnesses attended, including Lady Derby.  The bench of three magistrates judged that there was sufficient evidence to proceed and Winstanley's case was committed to trial at the court of assizes.  Winstanley was held on remand in Walton Gaol.

At the Manchester Assizes in December Winstanley's case was prosecuted by Henry Ince Nelson QC and Robert Shenstone Nicklin and his defence led by Rose Heilbron QC and George Currie; the judge was Mr Justice Jones.  The defence did not dispute the facts of the killings and focussed instead on Winstanley's previous good character and his state of mind at the time of the shootings.  Heilbron suggested that Winstanley had suffered a schizophrenic episode and could not, in that time, distinguish between right and wrong.  The only witness called was Francis Brisby, the medical officer at Walton Gaol, who stated that Winstanley was suffering from schizophrenia.

The case concluded on 16 December.  The jury did not need to retire to consider their decision but, in a conference in the jury box, quickly returned a verdict of guilty but insane on the two counts of murder.   Mr Justice Jones ordered Winstanley to be detained at Her Majesty's pleasure and he was committed to Broadmoor Hospital.  No motive for the killings was ever established, with Winstanley and the other staff stating that relation swith their employers were amicable.

Legacy 

Lady Derby made a full recovery from her wound.  The killings, together with Lord Derby's role as lord lieutenant, meaning he would need to welcome Elizabeth II to Lancashire on a visit in 1954, led to him ordering a dramatic remodelling of Knowsley House by architect Claud Phillimore, 4th Baron Phillimore.  As around 40 rooms of the house were unused, and to save the expense of their heating and the risk of dry rot, Phillimore decided on a significant reduction in the floor plan.

Between January 1953 and April 1954 an entire wing of the house and a library were demolished, reducing the footprint by a third.  Significant remodelling was also carried out to the servants' quarters.  This was the last time that an English home was designed to accommodate a large domestic staff.

Notes

References 

1952 in England
Crime in Merseyside
Murder in England
October 1952 events in the United Kingdom
1952 murders in the United Kingdom
Mass shootings in England
Workplace shootings